The City of Leipzig awards the Leipzig Book Award for European Understanding which has been given since 1994. The award is endowed with prize money of 20,000 Euro and is presented every year during the official opening of Leipzig Book Fair.

Recipients
Source:

 1994 Ryszard Kapuściński (Poland)
 1994 Eckhard Thiele (Germany)
 1995 Péter Nádas (Hungary)
 1995 Svetlana Geier (Germany)
 1996 Aleksandar Tišma (Serbia)
 1996 Fritz Mierau (Germany)
 1997 Imre Kertész (Hungary)
 1997 Antonín J. Liehm (Czech Republic)
 1998 Svetlana Alexievich (Belarus)
 1998 Ilma Rakusa (Switzerland)
 1998 Andreas Tretner (Germany)
 1999 Eric Hobsbawm (United Kingdom)
 1999 Nenad Popović (Serbia)
 2000 Hanna Krall (Poland)
 2000 Peter Urban (Germany)
 2001 Claudio Magris (Italy)
 2001 Norbert Randow (Germany)
 2002 Bora Ćosić (Serbia)
 2002 Ludvík Kundera (Czech Republic)
 2003 Hugo Claus (Belgium)
 2003 Barbara Antkowiak (Germany)
 2004 Dževad Karahasan (Bosnia and Herzegovina)
 2004 Gábor Csordás (Hungary)
 2005 Slavenka Drakulić (Croatia)
 2006 Yurii Andrukhovych (Ukraine)
 2007 Gerd Koenen (Germany)
 2007 Michail Ryklin (Russia)
 2008 Geert Mak (Netherlands)
 2009 Karl Schlögel (Germany)
 2010 György Dalos (Hungary)
 2011 Martin Pollack (Austria)
 2012 Ian Kershaw (United Kingdom)
 2012 Timothy D. Snyder (United States)
 2013 Klaus-Michael Bogdal (Germany)
 2014 Pankaj Mishra (India)
 2015 Mircea Cărtărescu (Romania)
 2016 Heinrich August Winkler (Germany)
 2017 Mathias Énard (France)
 2018 Åsne Seierstad (Norway)
 2019 Masha Gessen (United States/Russia)
 2020 László F. Földényi (Hungary)
 2021 Johnny Pitts (United Kingdom/United States)
 2022 Karl-Markus Gauß (Austria)
 2023 Maria Stepanova (Russia)

References

External links
Leipzig Book Award for European Understanding, official website

German-language literary awards
Awards established in 1994
Fiction awards
Events in Leipzig